NGC 4102 is an intermediate barred spiral galaxy located in the northern constellation of Ursa Major. It is visible in a small telescope and has an apparent visual magnitude of 11.2. The galaxy was discovered April 12, 1789 by William Herschel. J. L. E. Dreyer described it as "bright, pretty small, round, brighter middle and bright nucleus". This galaxy is located at a distance of 60 million light years and is receding with a heliocentric radial velocity of 837 km/s. It is a member of the Ursa Major group of galaxies.

The morphological class of NGC 4102 is SABab or SAB(s)b?, which is a spiral galaxy with a bar-like feature around the core (SAB), no inner ring structure (s), and moderately tightly-wound spiral arms ('ab' or 'b'). However, the bar in this galaxy is considered particularly small for galaxies of this class. NGC 4102 has a region of intense star formation in the nuclear region, known as a starburst region.

The core of NHC 4102 is almost certainly an active galactic nucleus (AGN), which indicates it has a supermassive black hole (SMBH) that is generating energy by accreting material. It is an X-ray source with a spectrum similar to a Seyfert 2 galaxy. This type of AGN is known as a Type-2 LINER, or low-ionization nuclear emission-line region. This is due to a core that is obscured by intervening dusty materials and/or the SMBH is accreting material in an inefficient manner. The bolometric luminosity of the active nucleus is ·s−1.

References

External links
 

Ursa Major (constellation)

Intermediate spiral galaxies
LINER galaxies
Ursa Major Cluster

4102
38392
7096